Flurys is a tearoom and pastry shop located on Park Street in Kolkata.

The establishment was first opened in 1927 and today serves pastries, chocolates, puddings and cakes specialized to cuisines from around the world. Flurys is regarded as one of the finest places for dining in all of Kolkata. In 2013, Flurys expanded its presence to Bombay, opening a location at the Navi Mumbai airport. Flurys also designed a new menu with vegan and gluten-free options in that year. Last year, the franchise announced it would introduce tea bags sold in neighborhood groceries.

References

External links
Official website

Shops in India
1927 establishments in India